Jacob Levecq (1634–1675), né Jacques L'Evesque, who signed his name J. Leveck or J. L., and was also referred to as Jakob Lavecq, Jacobus Levecq, Jacobus L'Evesque, and Jacobus Lavecq, was a Dutch Golden Age painter trained by Rembrandt.

Biography

According to Houbraken, who was his pupil during the last nine months of his life, he had been trained by Rembrandt, but inherited a sum of money when his parents died, that he used to take care of himself, his two unmarried sisters and a blind half-brother. Houbraken could not recall much of his painting style, since he had been mostly sick while he was living in the house, and he no longer painted actively.

In his younger years Levecq travelled to Paris and Sedan where he painted portraits, and on his return to Dordrecht became a portrait painter in the manner of Jan de Baen. When he died, Houbraken inherited a third of his prints, but regretted the fact that as a young boy with little experience in such matters, he only chose prints by Lucas van Leyden and Albrecht Dürer, and had left the French prints for others, and so was very glad that he had received one anyway by Charles le Brun.

According to the RKD, he was Rembrandt's pupil from 1653 to 1655 and travelled south to France in 1660.

References

External links
 Works and literature at PubHist

1634 births
1675 deaths
Dutch Golden Age painters
Dutch male painters
Dutch portrait painters
Artists from Dordrecht
Pupils of Rembrandt